Rhynchites is a genus of leaf and bud weevils in the family of beetles known as Attelabidae.

Species
These nine species belong to the genus Rhynchites:
 Rhynchites auratus Schoenherr, 1833 c g
 Rhynchites bellus (Legalov & Fremuth, 2002) g
 Rhynchites dionysus Heer, O., 1864 c g
 Rhynchites fulgidus (Geoffroy, E.L., 1785) c g
 Rhynchites hageni Heyden, C. von & Heyden, L. von., 1866 c g
 Rhynchites orcinus Heyden, C. von & Heyden, L. von., 1866 c g
 Rhynchites rhedi (Schrank,  F.P., 1781) c g
 Rhynchites velatus LeConte, 1880 i c b
 Rhynchites viridiaeneus Randall, 1838 i c
Data sources: i = ITIS, c = Catalogue of Life, g = GBIF, b = Bugguide.net

References

Further reading

External links

 

Attelabidae